Castino is an Italian village located in Piedmont (Province of Cuneo), about  southeast of Turin and about  northeast of Cuneo.

It is on a ridge between two valleys named after the rivers Bormida and Belbo.

References

Cities and towns in Piedmont